Phoebe subalbaria is a species of beetle in the family Cerambycidae. It was described by Belon in 1896. It is known from Bolivia and Brazil.

References

Hemilophini
Beetles described in 1896